The 2014 Tour de France was the 101st edition of the race, one of cycling's Grand Tours. The  race included 21 stages, starting in Leeds, Yorkshire, United Kingdom, on 5 July and finishing on the Champs-Élysées in Paris on 27 July. The race also visited Belgium for part of a stage. Vincenzo Nibali of the  team won the overall general classification by more than seven minutes, the biggest winning margin since 1997. By winning, he had acquired victories in all Grand Tours. Jean-Christophe Péraud placed second, with Thibaut Pinot third.

He lost the following day to stage winner Nibali as the race reached the mountains. Nibali held the race lead until the end of the ninth stage, when it was taken by 's Tony Gallopin. The yellow jersey returned to Nibali the following stage, and he held it until the conclusion of the race.

The points classification was decided early in the race and was won by 's Peter Sagan. Pinot finished as the best young rider. Kittel and Nibali won the most stages, with four each.

Following criticism by the professional women's peloton and campaign groups like Le Tour Entier regarding the lack of a women's Tour de France, a one day women's race - La Course by Le Tour de France - was held on the Champs-Élysées, prior to the last stage of the Tour.

Teams

Twenty-two teams participated in the 2014 edition of the Tour de France. The race was the 18th of the 29 events in the UCI World Tour, and all of its eighteen UCI ProTeams were automatically invited, and obliged, to attend the race. The team presentation – where the members of each team's roster are introduced in front of the media and local dignitaries – took place at the First Direct Arena in Leeds, United Kingdom, on 3 July, two days before the opening stage held in the city. The riders arrived at the arena by a ceremonial ride from the University of Leeds. The event included performances from Embrace and Opera North, in front of an audience of 10,000.

Each squad was allowed a maximum of nine riders, therefore the start list contained a total of 198 riders. Of these, 47 were riding the Tour de France for the first time. The riders came from 34 countries; France, Spain, Italy, Netherlands, Germany, Australia and Belgium all had 10 or more riders in the race. 's Ji Cheng was the first Chinese rider to participate in the Tour. Riders from eight countries won stages during the race; German riders won the largest number of stages, with seven. The average age of riders in the race was 29.88 years, ranging from the 20-year-old Danny van Poppel to the 42-year-old Jens Voigt, both  riders. Voigt, riding in his final year as a professional, equalled Stuart O'Grady's record for most appearances in the Tour with 17.  had the highest average age, while  had the lowest.

The teams entering the race were:

Pre-race favourites

According to many observers before the race the top two favourites for the general classification were Chris Froome and Alberto Contador. Their closest rivals were thought to have been Vincenzo Nibali and Alejandro Valverde. A possible contender was the 2013 Tour runner-up, Nairo Quintana, who had chosen not to ride the Tour after his 2014 Giro d'Italia win that took place during May. Andy Schleck, who was retroactively awarded the 2010 Tour title, was selected by his team as a domestique, and was not considered a possible favourite. The other riders considered contenders for the general classification were Andrew Talansky, Rui Costa, Thibaut Pinot, Tejay van Garderen, Jurgen Van den Broeck.

Defending champion and runner-up in the 2012 Tour, Froome, had shown his form so far in the 2014 season by winning the general classification of two stage races, the Tour of Oman and the Tour de Romandie. Contador, winner of the 2007 and 2009 Tours, also won two stage races, the Tirreno–Adriatico and the Tour of the Basque Country in the lead-up to the Tour, placing second overall in the Volta ao Algarve, Volta a Catalunya and Critérium du Dauphiné. Nibali had missed the 2013 Tour as he had focused on the 2013 Giro, which he won. His highest Tour result was third in 2012. His best results so far in the 2014 season were fifth in the Tour de Romandie and seventh in the Dauphiné. Valverde, who placed eighth in the 2013 Tour and won the 2009 Vuelta a España, had a number of wins in the 2014 season prior to the Tour, most notably, the Vuelta a Andalucía stage race and the La Flèche Wallonne one-day race.

The sprinters considered favourites for the points classification and wins on the flat or hilly bunch sprint finishes were Peter Sagan, Mark Cavendish, André Greipel, Alexander Kristoff and  riders Marcel Kittel and John Degenkolb. Winner of the points classification in the two previous Tours, Sagan, had won the E3 Harelbeke one-day race and won the points classifications in three stage races, the Tirreno–Adriatico, the Tour of California and the Tour de Suisse, during the 2014 season up until the Tour. Cavendish, who won the points classification in 2011, had nine wins so far in the season and had the full backing of his team. Greipel had amassed a total of twelve wins during the season prior to the Tour, but his team would have to share support for him and Van den Broeck. Kristoff had won the Milan–San Remo, and was considered a dark horse for the points classification. Kittel was seen as a top contender for the bunch sprints, as he won the most stages in the 2013 Tour, a total of four. He had an amassed seven wins so far in the season, two of which were in the Giro. His major results of the season were first place in Gent–Wevelgem and second place in Paris–Roubaix, both one-day races.

Route and stages

On 14 December 2012, the ASO announced that the English historic county of Yorkshire would host the 2014 edition's early stages (known as the Grand Départ). Further details of the first three stages held in the United Kingdom were released on 17 January 2013. This was the fourth Tour to contain stages in the United Kingdom, after 1974, 1994 and 2007. The entire route was announced by the ASO on 23 October 2013 at the official presentation at the Palais des Congrès in Paris. At the event, Stephen Roche, winner of the 1987 Tour, described the route as "fairly soft". Notable features of the route were the fifth stage's sections of sett paving, the five high altitude stage finishes and the lack time trialling, with only stage twenty's  individual time trial.

The first of the two stages held in Yorkshire started in Leeds and finished in Harrogate, with stage two held between York and Sheffield. After a transfer to the East Anglian city of Cambridge, the race went south to the finish in London. The Tour transferred across the English Channel to the start of stage four Le Touquet-Paris-Plage, with the finish in Lille. Stage five began in Ypres, Belgium, and finished back in France. The following three stages crossed the north-east to the Vosges Mountains for stages nine and ten. The eleventh stage took place between Besançon and Oyonnax through the Jura Mountains. Stage twelve headed west to Saint-Étienne, with the next stage moving back east into the Chartreuse Mountains, with the finish at the Alpine ski resort of Chamrousse. The fourteenth stage ended in the town of Risoul. The following stage took the race south to Nîmes. After a transfer to Carcassonne, the route moved into the Pyrenees for the next two stages. The nineteenth stage took a northerly direction to the department of Dordogne and the location of stage twenty. A long transfer took the Tour back to the north-east to finish with the Champs-Élysées stage in Paris.

Nine stages were officially classified as flat, five as medium mountain and six as high mountain. Stage five, although classified as medium mountain, was flat with sett paving sections. There were five summit finishes: stage 10, to La Planche des Belles Filles; stage 13, to Chamrousse; stage 14, to Risoul; stage 17, to Saint-Lary Pla d’Adet; and stage 18, to Hautacam. The highest point of elevation in the race was the -high Col d'Izoard mountain pass on stage fourteen. It was among six hors catégorie (English: beyond category) rated climbs in the race. There were nine new stage start or finish locations. The rest days were after stage 10, in the Besançon, and after 15, in Carcassonne.

Race overview

Opening week and Vosges

The first stage's bunch sprint finish was won by Marcel Kittel. A crash in the sprint caused Mark Cavendish, a favourite for the win, to fall; he did not start stage two. Kittel gained the race leader's yellow jersey and the green jersey as the leader of the points classification, with Jens Voigt taking the polka dot jersey as the leader of the mountains classification. In the following stage, likened to a "mini Liège-Bastogne-Liège", Vincenzo Nibali took the stage win and yellow jersey, attacking on Sheffield's hilly terrain with  remaining. Peter Sagan took the green jersey and Cyril Lemoine took the polka dot jersey. Stages three and four, finishing in London and Lille respectively, ended in bunch sprints and were both won by Kittel. Crashes in stages four and five forced pre-race favourite Chris Froome to abandon the race; his injuries were later revealed to be fractures to his left wrist and right hand. The weather was wet throughout the fifth stage, with the sett paving causing many crashes (although not Froome's). Nibali, who placed third, extended his overall lead over his rivals, with Alberto Contador 2 min 37 s down. André Greipel won stage six's bunch sprint in Reims. Another bunch sprint took place at the end of the next stage, with the hilly finish decided by a photo finish between Sagan and the winner Matteo Trentin.

His win put Kadri into the polka dot jersey. Another solo victory came the following day, when Tony Martin of  dropped fellow breakaway rider Alessandro De Marchi with  remaining. A large group that formed in pursuit of the duo finished 2 min 45 s behind, with the unconcerned general classification contenders coming together in at 7 min 46 s down. The yellow jersey went to a rider from the first group, 's Tony Gallopin. Martin now led the mountains classification. Stage ten was the Tour's first high mountain stage. On the final climb to the finish at La Planche des Belles Filles, Nibali attacked from the group of overall contenders with  remaining, passed two surviving riders from the day's early breakaway, and claimed his second stage win, which put him back in the yellow jersey. Joaquim Rodríguez, one of the two breakaway riders, took the polka dot jersey. Contador crashed during the descent of the Petit Ballon,  into the stage, forcing him to quit the race; it was later revealed that he had fractured his right tibia. The next day was the first rest day of the Tour.

Jura and Alps

Stage eleven's rolling terrain resulted in a final peloton that included mainly puncheurs; Gallopin won the stage after an attack  from the finish in Oyonnax split the peloton and a second with  remaining that successfully held off the chasers. The twelfth stage was won by Alexander Kristoff from a bunch sprint. Nibali took the stage win the following stage, making his move from the leading group in the final  on the hors catégorie climb to Chamrousse. He extended his lead over the second-placed overall rider Alejandro Valverde to 3 min 37 s. Nibali took the lead of the mountains classification. In stage fourteen, Rafał Majka attacked from a reduced breakaway on the climb to the finish in Risoul with  remaining and managed to hold off chasing the group of overall favourites and soloed to victory. Nibali, second in the stage, extended his lead further by one minute as Valverde lost time and Rodríguez regained the polka dot jersey. Kristoff won the bunch sprint in the transitional stage fifteen.

In the first of the three stages in the Pyrenees, the sixteenth, a breakaway group of 21 riders formed  in. The group of general classification favourites came in over eight minutes down. Majka led the mountains classification. The Tour's queen stage, the seventeenth, featured three first-category climbs and the hors catégorie climb to the finish at Saint-Lary Pla d’Adet. This led to the formation of a large lead group which gradually split across the middle climbs. Rodriguez and Majka led the lead group race over the penultimate climb, with the former first. On the final climb, a group of four that had escaped were caught by Majka, who had dropped Rodríguez, and he soloed to claim his second stage win and the large number of points for the summit finish. Nibali had split apart the group of chasing overall favourites and came in third. Second-placed overall Valverde lost a minute to Thibaut Pinot in third.

Pyrenees and finale

The Tour's final mountain stage, the eighteenth, saw Nibali take his fourth victory of the race at Hautacam; his stage winning move came  from the finish, on the climb to Hautacam. He finished 1 min 10 s ahead of a group which were four of his nearest general classification rivals, with the exception of Valverde, who lost further time and dropped to fourth overall, displaced by Thibaut Pinot and Jean-Christophe Péraud, respectively. Majka finished third in the stage and secured the mountains classification. In stage nineteen, Ramūnas Navardauskas of  attacked a peloton fractured by rain  from the finish to win the stage.  Martin claimed his second stage of the Tour in the penultimate stage's individual time trial. His time of 1h 6 min 21 s over the  course was 1 min 39 s faster than second-placed Tom Dumoulin. Nibali finished fourth, increasing his advantage.

In the final stage, Kittel secured a second successive victory on the Champs-Élysées in Paris, his fourth stage win of the race. Nibali finished the race to win the general classification by a margin of 7 min 39 s, the largest winning margin since Jan Ullrich in the 1997 Tour. Second and third respectively were Péraud and Pinot, with the latter 8 min 15 s down on Nibali. The points classification was won by Sagan with 431 points; Kristoff came second with 282 points. Majka finished with 181 points in the mountains classification, 13 ahead of second-placed Nibali. Pinot was the best young rider, with Romain Bardet second. Of the 198 starters, 164 reached the finish of the last stage in Paris.

Classification leadership and minor prizes

There were four main individual classifications contested in the 2014 Tour de France, as well as a team competition. The most important was the general classification, which was calculated by adding each rider's finishing times on each stage. There were no time bonuses given at the end of stages for this edition of the Tour. If a crash had happened within the final  of a stage, not including the time trial and summit finishes, the riders involved would have received the same time as the group they were in when the crash occurred. The rider with the lowest cumulative time was the winner of the general classification and was considered the overall winner of the Tour. The rider leading the classification wore a yellow jersey.

The second classification was the points classification. Riders received points for finishing among the highest placed in a stage finish, or in intermediate sprints during the stage. The points available for each stage finish were determined by the stage's type. The leader was identified by a green jersey.

The third classification was the mountains classification. Points were awarded to the riders that reached the summit of the most difficult climbs first. The climbs were categorised as fourth-, third-, second-, first-category and hors catégorie, with the more difficult climbs rated lower. Double points were awarded on the summit finishes on stages 10, 13, 14, 17 and 18. The leader wore a white jersey with red polka dots.

The final individual classification was the young rider classification. This was calculated the same way as the general classification, but the classification was restricted to riders who were born on or after 1 January 1989. The leader wore a white jersey.

The final classification was a team classification. This was calculated using the finishing times of the best three riders per team on each stage; the leading team was the team with the lowest cumulative time. The number of stage victories and placings per team determined the outcome of a tie. The riders in the team that lead this classification were identified with yellow number bibs on the back of their jerseys and yellow helmets.

In addition, there was a combativity award given after each stage to the rider considered, by a jury, to have "made the greatest effort and who has demonstrated the best qualities of sportsmanship". No combativity awards were given for the time trial and the final stage. The winner wore a red number bib the following stage. At the conclusion of the Tour, Alessandro De Marchi won the overall super-combativity award, again, decided by a jury.

A total of €2,035,000 was awarded in cash prizes in the race. The overall winner of the general classification received €450,000, with the second and third placed riders got €200,000 and €100,000 respectively. All finishers of the race were awarded with money. The holders of the classifications benefited on each stage they led; the final winners of the points and mountains were given €25,000, while the best young rider and most combative rider got €20,000. The winners of the team classification received €50,000. There were also two special awards each with a prize of €5000, the Souvenir Henri Desgrange, given to first rider to pass the summit of the highest climb in the Tour, the Col d'Izoard in stage fourteen, and the Souvenir Jacques Goddet, given to the first rider to pass Goddet's memorial at the summit of the Col du Tourmalet in stage eighteen. Joaquim Rodríguez won the Henri Desgrange and Blel Kadri won the Jacques Goddet.

 In stage two, Bryan Coquard, who was third in the points classification, wore the green jersey, because Marcel Kittel (in first place) wore the yellow jersey as leader of the general classification and Peter Sagan (in second place) wore the white jersey as leader of the young rider classification during that stage.
 In stages three–five, Romain Bardet, who was second in the young rider classification, wore the white jersey, because Peter Sagan (in first place) wore the green jersey as leader of the points classification. Additionally, in stages six–seven, Michał Kwiatkowski wore the white jersey for the same reason.
 In stage fourteen, Joaquim Rodríguez, who was second in the mountains classification, wore the polka-dot jersey, because Vincenzo Nibali (in first place) wore the yellow jersey as leader of the general classification.

Final standings

General classification

Points classification

Mountains classification

Young rider classification

Team classification

UCI World Tour rankings

Riders from the ProTeams competing individually, as well as for their teams and nations, for points that contributed towards the World Tour rankings. Points were awarded to the top twenty finishers in the general classification and to the top five finishers in each stage. The 200 points accrued by Vincenzo Nibali moved him from fortieth position to second in the individual ranking.  retained their lead of the team ranking, ahead of second-placed . Spain remained as leaders of the nation ranking, with Italy second.

See also

 2014 in men's road cycling
 2014 in sports

Notes

References

Bibliography

Further reading

External links

 

 
Tour de France by year
Tour de France
Tour de France
Tour de France
Cycle races in England
Cycling in Yorkshire